This is a list of films produced in Malaysia ordered by year of release in the 1970s.

For an alphabetical listing of Malaysian films see :Category:Malaysian films.

External links
Malaysian film at the Internet Movie Database
Malaysian Feature Films Finas
Cinema Online Malaysia

1970s
Lists of 1970s films
Films